Paul Grod is president of the Ukrainian World Congress and president and CEO of Rodan Energy. Prior to his presidency of the UWC, he was president of the Ukrainian Canadian Congress and vice-president of the UWC.

In March 2014, Grod was one of 13 Canadians sanctioned by Russia and barred from entering the country.

Overview
Grod is a member of the Law Society of Ontario and holds Bachelor of Political Science, Bachelor of Laws, and Master of Business Administration degrees. Prior to founding Rodan Energy, Grod was a corporate and investment banker with CIBC World Markets and a lawyer with Gowling Lafleur Henderson LLP practicing corporate finance and M&A law. He has experience in election monitoring having led several international election observation missions in Ukraine.

Personal life 
Grod is married and has four young children.

Honours
Grod was awarded the Queen's Diamond Jubilee Medal at a ceremony on Parliament Hill on May 17, 2012, by Immigration, Citizenship and Multiculturalism Minister Jason Kenney in recognition for his significant contributions and achievements in service to Canada.

For a third consecutive year, Grod was named in 2014 as one of the top 100 people influencing Canada's global future by Embassy Magazine & Hill Times’ Power and Influence magazine.

Grod was awarded Ukraine's 25th Anniversary Jubilee Medal by the President of Ukraine.

References

External links

Paul Grod - President of the Ukrainian Canadian Congress, biography
Paul Grod, President & CEO of Rodan Energy

 	 

 	 

Living people
Businesspeople from Toronto
Canadian business executives
Canadian people of Ukrainian descent
Year of birth missing (living people)